The 2009 election for the leadership of the AFL–CIO occurred following the announcement of incumbent president John Sweeney's retirement. The election took place during the 26th AFL–CIO National Convention in Pittsburgh.

The event was preceded by a 2008 speech at which then-Secretary-Treasurer Richard Trumka had blasted the perceived racism being directed against 2008 Democratic presidential candidate Barack Obama, increasing his profile both inside and outside the labor movement. Trumka, who had served as Secretary-Treasurer since first being elected in 1995, received no contest for the position of president.

Candidates
Note: Winning candidates are in bold.
 President
 Richard Trumka

 Secretary-Treasurer
 Liz Shuler
 Gregory Junemann

 Executive Vice-President
 Arlene Holt Baker

Other electees
The total number of vice-presidents of the federation was expanded from 43 (including the Executive Vice-President) to 51.

The following were elected to other vice-presidencies besides the Executive Vice-Presidency:
 Patrick D. Finley, Plasterers and Cement Masons (OP&CMIA)
 Mike Futhey, United Transportation Union (UTU)
 Newton Jones, Boilermakers (IBB)
 D. Michael Langford, Utility Workers (UWUA)
 Robert McEllrath, International Longshore and Warehouse Union (ILWU)
 Roberta Reardon, American Federation of Television and Radio Artists (AFTRA)
 John Ryan, Glass, Molders, Pottery, Plastics and Allied Works (GMP)
 DeMaurice Smith, Professional Athletes
 Baldemar Velasquez, Farm Labor Organizing Committee (FLOC)
 James Andrews, NC State AFL–CIO
 Mark Ayers, Building and Construction Trades Department
 James Boland, Bricklayers 
 R. Thomas Buffenbarger, Machinists
 Larry Cohen, Communications Workers of America
 Rose Ann DeMoro, National Nurses United
 Maria Elena Durazo, LA County AFL–CIO
 Roy Flores, AFGE
 John Gage, AFGE
 Leo W. Gerard, United Steelworkers
 Vincent Giblin, Operating Engineers
 Michael Goodwin, Office and Professional Employees
 Edwin D. Hill, Electrical Workers
 William Hite, Plumbers and Pipe Fitters
 General Holiefield, AW
 Ken Howard, Screen Actors
 Richard Hughes, Longshoremen
 Frank Hurt, Bakery, Confectionery, Tobacco Workers and Grain Millers 
 Lorretta Johnson, AFT 
 Gregory Junemann, International Federation of Professional and Technical Engineers
 Bob King, UAW
 James Little, Transport Workers
 Matthew Loeb, Theatrical Stage Employees
 William Lucy, Postal Workers
 Gerald W. McEntee, AFSCME
 Capt. Lee Moak, Air Line Pilots
 Joseph J. Nigro, Sheet Metal Workers
 Terry O'Sullivan, LIUNA
 Fred Redmond, United Steelworkers 
 Clyde Rivers, California School Employees Association 
 Cecil Roberts, Mine Workers
 Fredric Rolando, Letter Carriers
 Michael Sacco, Seafarers
 Lee Saunders, AFSCME
 Robert A. Scardelletti, Transportation Communications Union
 Harold A. Schaitberger, Fire Fighters
 Veda Shook, Flight Attendants-CWA
 Bruce Smith, Glass, Molders, Pottery, Plastics and Allied Workers
 Robbie Sparks, IBEW
 Randi Weingarten, AFT
 John Wilhelm, UNITEHERE!
 James Williams, Painters and Allied Trades 
 Walter Wise, Ironworkers
 Nancy Wohlforth, OPEIU 
 Diann Woodard, School Administrators

References

Trade union elections
AFL–CIO
2009 elections in the United States
Non-partisan elections